Sargis Khachatryan is a Brazilian Greco-Roman wrestler. He is of Armenian descent. He competed at the Pan American Wrestling Championships three times: at the 2020 Pan American Wrestling Championships held in Ottawa, Canada he won the bronze medal in the 55 kg event, in 2019 he won the silver medal and at the 2018 Pan American Wrestling Championships held in Lima, Peru he won the gold medal in this event.

Major results

References

External links 
 

Living people
Year of birth missing (living people)
Place of birth missing (living people)
Brazilian male sport wrestlers
Brazilian people of Armenian descent
Pan American Wrestling Championships medalists
21st-century Brazilian people